Christopher Carroll Slade (born January 30, 1971) is an American former professional football player who was a linebacker in the National Football League (NFL) for nine seasons.  He played college football for the Virginia Cavaliers, and earned consensus All-American honors.  A second-round pick in the 1993 NFL Draft, he played professionally for the New England Patriots and Carolina Panthers of the NFL.  Slade was recognized as a Pro Bowl selection and All-Pro after the  season. He is currently an assistant coach at Virginia.

Personal life
Slade was born in Newport News, Virginia.  He graduated from Tabb High School in Yorktown, Virginia, where he played for the Tabb Tigers high school football team. Chris was the head football coach at Pace Academy  from 2013 to 2021 and has two children.

College career
While attending the University of Virginia on an athletic scholarship, Slade played for coach George Welsh's Cavaliers teams from 1989 to 1992.  As a senior in 1992 and a junior in 1991, he was recognized as a consensus first-team All-American. Slade still holds the Atlantic Coast Conference record for most career sacks with 40.

Professional career
In nine NFL seasons, he played in 142 regular season games, started 108 of them, and compiled 665 tackles, 53.5 quarterback sacks, 16 forced fumbles, three interceptions and two touchdowns.

NFL statistics

Coaching career
Slade was the head football coach at Pace Academy in Atlanta. His 2015 Pace Academy varsity squad won the AA 2015 Georgia High School football Championship on December 12, 2015. He resigned from Pace Academy on December 7, 2021, and on January 3, 2022, Slade was announced as an assistant coach at Virginia under new head coach Tony Elliott.

References

External links
 Virginia profile

1971 births
Living people
American football linebackers
Carolina Panthers players
New England Patriots players
Virginia Cavaliers football coaches
Virginia Cavaliers football players
High school football coaches in Georgia (U.S. state)
All-American college football players
American Conference Pro Bowl players
Tabb High School alumni
Sportspeople from Newport News, Virginia
Coaches of American football from Virginia
Players of American football from Virginia
African-American coaches of American football
African-American players of American football
21st-century African-American sportspeople
20th-century African-American people